Samad bin Jambri is a Malaysian politician who is serving as the State Assistant Minister. He has served as the Member of Sabah State Legislative Assembly (MLA) for Labuk since September 2020. He is a member of the Parti Gagasan Rakyat Sabah (GAGASAN) which is aligned with the ruling Gabungan Rakyat Sabah (GRS) coalition both in federal and state levels.

Election results

References

Members of the Sabah State Legislative Assembly
Malaysian United Indigenous Party politicians
Living people
Year of birth missing (living people)